The Heartfulness Way is a book from 2018 about heart-based meditation, written by Kamlesh D. Patel and Joshua Pollock.

About the book
In the book, Kamlesh D. Patel, also known as Daaji, describes the principles of the so-called heartfulness practice and philosophy to Joshua Pollock, a heartfulness practitioner and trainer.

The book is available in English, Hindi, Tamil, Telugu, Malayalam, Gujarati, Kannada and Marathi.

Publication and release
The Heartfulness Way was published by Westland Publications Pvt. Ltd. in India and by Reveal Press (New Harbinger Publications) in the USA in 2018, with its text copyrights belonging to Heartfulness Institute, Texas, USA.  Ram Nath Kovind, the President of India, was present for the book's release on January 4, 2018.

Reception
The book was reviewed in the journal Prabuddha Bharata which called it a step by step guide to the theory and practice of meditation told in an easy to understand manner, and Moin Qazi, writing for Asian Age, gave it a favourable review. It was ranked 1st in Hindustan Times' Nielsen top 10 lists of the Best non-fiction books chart for India.

References and citations

2018 non-fiction books
Books about spirituality
Self-help books
Westland Books books